As Sawma'ah District  is a district of the Al Bayda' Governorate, Yemen. As of 2003, the district had a population of 44,873 inhabitants.

History 
In August 2020 Al-Qaeda fighters crucified a doctor in As Sawma'ah. On 15 September 2021 the district center was captured by Houthis.

References

Districts of Al Bayda Governorate
As Sawma'ah District